Ellendea Proffer Teasley (born 1944) is an American author, publisher, and translator of Russian literature into English.

Biography
She received her Ph.D. from Indiana University, taught at Wayne State University and University of Michigan, Dearborn. She is a well-known Bulgakov expert, translator and publisher. She is known for Mikhail Bulgakov: Life & Work (1984); translations of Bulgakov's plays and prose; numerous articles and introductions, most prominently the Notes and Afterword to the Burgin-O'Connor translation of Bulgakov's The Master and Margarita.

She married  Carl R. Proffer (1938–1984), and co-founded Ardis Publishers in 1971, a publishing house specializing in Russian literature, both in English and Russian. As a publisher, she was responsible for the collected works of Bulgakov in Russian, which then triggered a Soviet edition. Proffer Teasley edited a series of well-received photo-biographies, including those devoted to Nabokov, Tsvetaeva and Bulgakov. Her memoir of Joseph Brodsky, Brodsky Among Us, was published in English in 2017, after the Russian translation was published in Moscow in 2015, where it became a bestseller.

Ellendea Proffer was on the first judges' panel for the Booker Russian Novel Prize, and in 1989 received a Macarthur Fellowship for her work with Ardis.

The Ardis archives, including Carl and Ellendea Proffer's papers,  are held at University of Michigan.
The archive consists of a collection of manuscripts, typescripts, correspondences, books, photographs, and proofs of selected titles.

Lectures in English

 "One Book, Two Cultures: Brodsky Among Us" (Harvard Davis Center, 2017). https://www.youtube.com/watch?v=2FuBDigwrQw
 "How Censorship Leads to Tamizdat [publishing abroad]" (Tamizdat Conference, Hunter College, NYC, 2018). https://www.youtube.com/watch?v=fOPmbJaKCGg
 "Writing in a Time of Terror: Mikhail Bulgakov" (Dillard University, New Orleans, 2019). https://vimeo.com/326628255

Talks in Russian
 "" (Dostoevsky Library, Moscow, 2015) with Anton Dolin. http://www.youtube.com/watch?v=ijYImQyhi5U
 "" (MMOMA, Moscow, 2017) with Anton Dolin). https://www.youtube.com/watch?v=Cn2XBbQ9Iss

Awards
1989 MacArthur Fellows Program

References

 Boyd, Brian. Nabokov: the Later Years
 Vasily Aksyonov, In Search of Melancholy Baby
 Lev Kopelev & Raya Orlova, We Lived in Moscow

External links
 https://www.youtube.com/watch?v=UqQgsgKNNII (CBS Morning Show on Proffer, 1983)
 https://www.youtube.com/watch?v=7GpGk_HBTHE (“Russian Visa” [in Russian] program on Ardis; interview with Ellendea Proffer)
 https://www.youtube.com/watch?v=771fsa2fpGM (Ardis Publishers interviews 1999) 
 Cynthia Haven,"The Book that's rocking Russia: Ellendea Proffer's Brodsky Among Us is a bestseller," The Book Haven, 20 April 2015. Discussion of Russian publication of book with Corpus.
 https://www.thenation.com/article/archive/joseph-brodsky-darker-and-brighter/ Cynthia Haven, "Joseph Brodsky, Darker and Brighter: A spellbinding new biography rescues the poet from sentimentality and kitsch," The Nation, March 24, 2016. 

1944 births
Living people
University of Maryland, College Park alumni
MacArthur Fellows
American translators
Russian–English translators
American women writers
21st-century American women